Khonsa is the headquarters of Tirap district in the Indian state of Arunachal Pradesh. It also houses Ramakrishna Sarada Mission School, Christ The King ICSE School. The Noctes, a Wancho tribe, are the indigenous population, although the town is cosmopolitan in nature, people from every Indian state can be found here.

Geography
It has an average elevation of 1215 metres (3986 feet).

Demographics
 India census, Khonsa had a population of 9229. Males constitute 56% of the population and females 44%. Khonsa has an average literacy rate of 74%, higher than the national average of 59.5%: male literacy is 80%, and female literacy is 65%. In Khonsa, 15% of the population is under 6 years of age.

The majority of the people are Christians, mostly Baptist, although some are Roman Catholics. There are relatively few animists. Among Nocte Catholics, syncretism between traditional religions and Christianity is evident.  American-sponsored missionaries in Khonsa and neighboring districts. Christ King Catholic Church Khonsa is helping the people to grow up in spirituality.

Languages

According to Census 2011, Nocte is Spoken by 2,704 people, Hindi at 1,327 people, Bengali by 1,008, Nepali by 823 people, Wancho at 799, Bhojpuri by 555 people and Assamese at 473.

See also

 Wikipedia:WikiProject Indian cities

References

External links
 Preaching in India's Northeast for Cultural Preservation
 Khonsa Catholic Parish

Tirap district
Cities and towns in Tirap district